Cornelius O'Callaghan, 1st Baron Lismore (7 January 1741 – 12 July 1797), was an Irish politician and peer.

O'Callaghan was the son of Thomas O'Callaghan and Sarah Davis. He served in the Irish House of Commons as the Member of Parliament for Fethard, County Tipperary, between 1768 and 1785. On 27 June 1785 he was made Baron Lismore, of Shanbally, in the Peerage of Ireland, and assumed his seat in the Irish House of Lords.

He married Frances Ponsonby, daughter of John Ponsonby and Lady Elizabeth Cavendish, on 13 December 1774. he was succeeded in his title by his eldest son, Cornelius O'Callaghan, who was created Viscount Lismore in 1806. Another son was the British Army officer, Sir Robert O'Callaghan. One of Lord Lismore's daughters, Louisa, married William Cavendish and was the mother of The 7th Duke of Devonshire.

References

1741 births
1797 deaths
Barons in the Peerage of Ireland
Peers of Ireland created by George III
Irish MPs 1769–1776
Irish MPs 1776–1783
Irish MPs 1783–1790
Members of the Irish House of Lords
Cornelius
Members of the Parliament of Ireland (pre-1801) for County Tipperary constituencies